Alfred James Freeman (2 April 1892 – 28 April 1972) was an English cricketer active in 1920 who played for Essex. He was born in Edmonton, Middlesex and died in Chelmsford. He appeared in one first-class match as a lefthanded batsman who bowled left arm medium pace. He scored one run and took no wickets.

Notes

1892 births
1972 deaths
English cricketers
Essex cricketers